Ponikiew may refer to the following places:
Ponikiew, Lesser Poland Voivodeship (south Poland)
Ponikiew, Masovian Voivodeship (east-central Poland)
Ponikiew, West Pomeranian Voivodeship (north-west Poland)